Samantha Munro (born October 19, 1990) is a Canadian actress. She is known for her role as Anya MacPherson on Degrassi: The Next Generation. She also played the role of Shannen Doherty in Lifetime's 2015 television film The Unauthorized Beverly Hills, 90210 Story.

Career 
Munro played the starring role of Anya MacPherson on Degrassi: The Next Generation for the series' seventh through eleventh seasons. In 2015, Munro was cast in the role of Shannen Doherty in Lifetime's The Unauthorized Beverly Hills, 90210 Story television film.

Personal life 
On September 1, 2019, she married Kyle Zavitz, a jazz composer, in Cambridge, Ontario.

Filmography

References

External links 
 

21st-century Canadian actresses
Canadian child actresses
Canadian film actresses
Canadian television actresses
Living people
1990 births